Cnemaspis graniticola is a species of diurnal, rock-dwelling, insectivorous gecko endemic to  India. It is distributed in Andhra Pradesh.

References

 Cnemaspis graniticola

graniticola
Reptiles of India
Reptiles described in 2020